SELNEC was an acronym for "South East Lancashire North East Cheshire". It may refer to:

Greater Manchester, a metropolitan county of North West England
SELNEC Passenger Transport Executive, from 1969 until renamed Greater Manchester Passenger Transport Executive in 1974